Arctium is a genus of biennial plants commonly known as burdock, family Asteraceae. Native to Europe and Asia, several species have been widely introduced worldwide. Burdock's clinging properties, in addition to providing an excellent mechanism for seed dispersal, led to the invention of the hook and loop fastener.

Description

They are generally large, coarse and ovate, with the lower ones being heart-shaped. They are woolly underneath. The leafstalks are generally hollow. Arctium species generally flower from July through to October. Burdock flowers provide essential pollen and nectar for honeybees around August when clover is on the wane and before the goldenrod starts to bloom.

Burdock's clinging properties provides it an excellent mechanism for seed dispersal.

Taxonomy
A large number of species have been placed in genus Arctium at one time or another, but most of them are now classified in the related genus Cousinia. The precise limits between Arctium and Cousinia are hard to define; there is an exact relation between their molecular phylogeny. The burdocks are sometimes confused with the cockleburs (genus Xanthium) and rhubarb (genus Rheum).

Accepted species 
The following species are accepted:

 
Arctium abolinii 
Arctium alberti 
Arctium × ambiguum 
Arctium amplissimum 
Arctium anomalum 
Arctium arctiodes 
Arctium atlanticum  – Algeria, Morocco
Arctium aureum 
Arctium chloranthum 
Arctium dolichophyllum 
Arctium × dualis 
Arctium echinopifolium 
Arctium egregium 
Arctium elatum 
Arctium evidens 
Arctium fedtschenkoanum 
Arctium grandifolium 
Arctium haesitabundum 
Arctium horrescens 
Arctium karatavicum 
Arctium korolkowii 
Arctium korshinskyi 
Arctium lappa  – greater burdock – much of Eurasia; naturalized in North America, Australia and New Zealand
Arctium lappaceum 
Arctium × leiobardanum  – Siberia
Arctium leiospermum 
Arctium × maassii 
Arctium macilentum 
Arctium medians 
Arctium minus  – lesser burdock – Europe and southwestern Asia; naturalized in North and South America, Australia and New Zealand
Arctium × mixtum 
Arctium nemorosum 
Arctium nidulans 
Arctium × nothum  – central and eastern Europe
Arctium palladinii  – Turkey, Iran, Caucasus
Arctium pallidivirens 
Arctium pentacanthoides 
Arctium pentacanthum 
Arctium pseudarctium  – Afghanistan, Tajikistan
Arctium pterolepidum 
Arctium radula 
Arctium refractum 
Arctium sardaimionense  – Tajikistan
Arctium schmalhausenii 
Arctium × semiconstrictum 
Arctium tomentellum 
Arctium tomentosum  – woolly burdock – northern and eastern Europe, Turkey, Iran, Caucasus, Siberia, Xinjiang; naturalized in North America
Arctium triflorum 
Arctium ugamense 
Arctium umbrosum 
Arctium vavilovii 
Arctium × zalewskii

Etymology 
Circa 16th century, from bur + dock, the latter meaning sorrel of the genus Rumex.

Ecology 
The roots of burdock, among other plants, are eaten by the larva of the ghost moth (Hepialus humuli). The plant is used as a food plant by other Lepidoptera including brown-tail, Coleophora paripennella, Coleophora peribenanderi, the Gothic, lime-speck pug and scalloped hazel.

The prickly heads of these plants (burrs) are noted for easily catching on to fur and clothing. In England, some birdwatchers have reported that birds have become entangled in the burrs leading to a slow death, as they are unable to free themselves.

Toxicity 
The green, above-ground portions may cause contact dermatitis in individual with allergies as the plant contains lactones.

Uses

Food and drink 

The taproot of young burdock plants can be harvested and eaten as a root vegetable. While generally out of favour in modern European cuisine, it is popular in East Asia. Plants are cultivated for their slender roots, which can grow up to about one metre long and two centimetres across. Burdock root is very crisp and has a sweet, mild, or pungent flavour with a little muddy harshness that can be reduced by soaking julienned or shredded roots in water for five to ten minutes. The roots have been used as potato substitutes in Russia.

Immature flower stalks may also be harvested in late spring, before flowers appear; their taste resembles that of artichoke, to which the burdock is related. The stalks are thoroughly peeled, and either eaten raw, or boiled in salt water. Leaves are also eaten in spring in Japan when a plant is young and leaves are soft. Some A. lappa cultivars are specialized for this purpose. Another is burdock makizushi (sushi filled with pickled burdock root; the burdock root is often artificially coloured orange to resemble a carrot).

In the second half of the 20th century, burdock achieved international recognition for its culinary use due to the increasing popularity of the macrobiotic diet, which advocates its consumption. It contains a fair amount of dietary fiber (GDF, 6 g per 100 g), calcium, potassium, and amino acids, and is low in calories. It contains the prebiotic fiber inulin.  It contains a polyphenol oxidase, which causes its darkened surface and muddy harshness by forming tannin-iron complexes. Burdock root's harshness harmonizes well with pork in miso soup (tonjiru) and with Japanese-style pilaf (takikomi gohan).

Dandelion and burdock is today a soft drink that has long been popular in the United Kingdom, which has its origins in hedgerow mead commonly drunk in the mediæval period. Burdock is believed to be a galactagogue, a substance that increases lactation, but it is sometimes recommended to be avoided during pregnancy based on animal studies that show components of burdock to cause uterus stimulation.

In Europe, burdock root was used as a bittering agent in beer before the widespread adoption of hops for this purpose.

Traditional medicine 
The seeds of A. lappa are used in traditional Chinese medicine under the name  (some dictionaries list the Chinese as just ).

Burdock is a traditional medicinal herb used for many ailments. Burdock root oil extract, also called bur oil, is used in Europe as a scalp treatment.

In culture 

In Turkish Anatolia, the burdock plant was believed to ward off the evil eye, and as such is often a motif appearing woven into kilims for protection. With its many flowers, the plant also symbolizes abundance. Before and during World War II, Japanese soldiers were issued a 15-1/2-inch bayonet held in a black-painted scabbard, the juken. Their nickname was the burdock sword (gobo ken).

Inspiration for velcro 
After taking his dog for a walk one day in the late 1940s (1948), George de Mestral, a Swiss inventor, became curious about the seeds of the burdock plant that had attached themselves to his clothes and to the dog's fur. Under a microscope, he looked closely at the hook system that the seeds use to hitchhike on passing animals aiding seed dispersal, and he realized that the same approach could be used to join other things together. His work led to the development of the hook and loop fastener, which was initially sold under the Velcro brand name.

Serbo-Croatian uses the same word, for burdock and velcro; Turkish does the same with the name , while in the Polish language  means both "burr" and "velcro".

References

External links 

 
Asteraceae genera
Medicinal plants
Root vegetables
Stem vegetables
Taxa named by Carl Linnaeus